KGO (810 kHz) is a commercial AM radio station licensed to San Francisco, California, and owned by Cumulus Media. KGO operates with 50,000 watts, the highest power permitted AM radio stations by the Federal Communications Commission, but uses a directional antenna to protect the other Class A station on 810 kHz, WGY in Schenectady, New York. Most nights, using a good radio, KGO can be heard throughout the Western United States east to the Rocky Mountains, and in Northern Mexico, Western Canada and Alaska.

Cumulus's offices are based on Battery Street in the SoMa portion of San Francisco's Financial District. KGO's transmitter site is based in Fremont near the Dumbarton Bridge. Its towers are noticeable enough that pilots use them as a waypoint in communications with local airports. Two of KGO's three towers partially collapsed during the Loma Prieta earthquake on October 17, 1989. All three were replaced.

Since October 2022, KGO has broadcast a sports talk format with an emphasis on sports betting; it is one of three sports stations owned by Cumulus Media in the San Francisco Bay Area, along with KNBR AM–FM and KTCT. From 1962 until 2022, the station was known for carrying news and talk programming. It was the number one radio station in the Bay Area in the Arbitron ratings from July 1978 to January 2009, a feat unmatched by any other station in the United States.

History

1920s and 1930s
After several late-night test broadcasts, using the experimental call sign 6XG, radio station KGO signed on the air on January 8, 1924, from General Electric's Oakland transformer manufacturing plant. (The original two-story brick building, constructed specifically for the station on East 14th Street, was demolished sometime in the 1980s.) KGO was part of a planned three-station network comprising WGY in Schenectady, New York, and KOA in Denver, Colorado. KGO was first known as the "Sunset Station" since it was General Electric's West Coast outlet. At that time it operated with a then-impressive 1,000 watts.

As was the custom with early radio stations, the programming consisted of performances by local talent, including the KGO Orchestra which provided some of the music, and a dramatic group known as the KGO Players, which performed weekly plays and short skits, often under the direction of Bay-area drama instructor Wilda Wilson Church. The station's music, which was also performed by other local orchestras and vocalists, included classical selections as well as popular dance music the next night. Due to GE's involvement in RCA and RCA's launch of the NBC Red Network, KGO was soon operated by NBC management out of studio facilities in San Francisco. See the KNBR entry for a fuller discussion of NBC's San Francisco radio operations.

In order to make its Schenectady outlet a clear channel station, GE effected a breakdown of 790 kHz. WGY would assume the maximum permissible power, and KGO would be lowered in power to 7,500 watts. That was then lower than the minimum permissible power for a clear channel station (10 kW), and also was then higher than the then maximum permissible power for a regional channel station (5 kW). Both stations retained omnidirectional antennas. Therefore, GE effectively removed from the West one of its eight clear channels and added another clear channel to the East, thereby giving the East nine cleared channels and the West only seven. The other "regions" in the Band Plan all retained their allotted eight cleared channels.

1940s and 1950s
In 1941, stations on 790, including WGY and KGO, were moved to 810 to comply with the North American Regional Broadcasting Agreement (NARBA). 
On December 1, 1947, KGO switched to a directional antenna and its power was increased to 50,000 watts, the new minimum standard power for a U.S. clear channel station. An article in Broadcasting magazine noted that the increase "retired the nation's oldest regularly operating transmitter-a 7,500-watter ... in use since Jan. 8, 1924."

When the Federal Communications Commission forced NBC to sell one of its two networks (and that network's owned-and-operated stations), KGO's license switched from Radio Corporation of America to the Blue Network, Inc., effective January 23, 1942. The NBC Blue Network simply dropped "NBC" from its name to become the "Blue Network," then in June 1945 re-branded itself the American Broadcasting Company. KGO became one of the founding stations of the ABC Radio Network as a result.

In the postwar period, KGO produced many live music programs, including that of Western Swing bandleader Bob Wills, whose music was a staple of the time. KGO was instrumental in bringing the first exercise show to broadcasting, hosted by Jack LaLanne, a fitness instructor and gym operator in nearby Oakland. LaLanne conducted his radio fitness show for many years on KGO, moving in the late 1950s to KGO-TV and a successful TV syndication career.

By the late 1950s, KGO had suffered poor ratings. In 1962, ABC management brought in new management, including program director Jim Dunbar from Chicago sister station WLS. Dunbar revamped the station into one of the country's first news/talk stations. While the new format was initially unsuccessful, Dunbar stressed the "live and local" aspect of the programming by running the talk shows every day from locations such as Johnny Kan's Chinese restaurant, Señor Pico's Restaurant, and the hungry i nightclub. This higher profile caused KGO's ratings to begin a steady climb. Among KGO's personalities during this period was future Radio Hall of Fame member J.P. McCarthy, the station's morning host in the early 1960s.

1960s–1980s
After trying various formats, KGO eventually shifted to news and talk programming, relying heavily on the ABC radio network for its news programs. KGO started carrying Paul Harvey's twice-daily programs but also began to develop a strong local news staff that produced extended morning and afternoon newscasts. The local talk show hosts included Les Crane, Owen Spann and Jim Eason, who often interviewed visiting celebrities in the KGO studios. Owen Spann also originated special broadcasts from Europe and Africa, interviewing government officials from those countries. Local director-actor Jack Brooks hosted a Saturday-morning entertainment program until his sudden death in June 1984, after directing a production of Kismet for the Capuchino Community Theatre that featured Jim Eason as the poet Omar Khayyám. Dr. Dean Edell began his regular medical programs at KGO, leading to nationally syndicated broadcasts.

Ratings and signal strength

For over 30 years, from July 1978 to January 2009, KGO was the number-one station in the San Francisco Bay Area in the Arbitron ratings, a feat unmatched by any other station in the United States. According to the 2010 Arbitron ratings, however, KGO had lost its lead to KCBS, with KOIT-FM as a close second, and KGO listing at third. When KGO switched to all-news in December 2011, it fell further behind in the local ratings. As of Spring 2013, KGO placed 16th in the market, with approximately half of their listenership when they were number one.

The KGO signal also registers with Arbitron as a station listened to in surrounding metropolitan areas. Due to the nature of its signal and antenna placement, KGO broadcasts on a north-to-south axis, keeping itself from interfering with WGY (Schenectady, New York) during the night-time and overnight hours when the station broadcasts at 50,000 watts. KGO's signal is received essentially free of static at night in locations such as Vancouver, Washington, Seattle, Washington, and San Diego, but is difficult to receive in Reno, Nevada, and other points east of the Sierra Nevada mountains due to its signal directionality. That said, its overall reach is greater than any FM signal in the Bay Area (according to radio-locator.com map referenced below).

1990s–2010s

Until December 5, 2011, KGO created nearly all of its own local programming, with very limited syndicated content. The majority of its programs were hosted by San Francisco Bay Area broadcasters. The daily schedule included many issues-oriented talk shows, with weekday hosts that included Gene Burns, Gil Gross, Ronn Owens, John Rothmann and lawyer Len Tillem. The station also carried a variety of specialty programs, particularly on weekends, with John Hamilton discussing travel and leisure, Gene Burns covering fine food and dining (on a show separate from his weekday program), Joanie Greggains hosting a health-and-fitness program, and Brent Walters, who teaches "Comparative Religions" at San Jose State University, hosting the early Sunday morning show, God Talk. In 2014, KGO brought in John Batchelor at midnight. News/talk weekend hosts now include Brian Copeland, "Karel" Charles Karel Bouley, and Pat Thurston.

Up to 2011, the weekday morning news (from 5 a.m. to 9 a.m.) was co-anchored by Jon Bristow and Jennifer Jones-Lee. The afternoon news (from 2 p.m. to 7 p.m.) featured veteran reporter Chris Brecher and award-winning reporter/anchor Bret Burkhart.

On December 2, 2011, new owner Cumulus Media announced that KGO was rebranding itself as "news and information," moving to an all-news format from 2 p.m. to 7 p.m. (in addition to the existing morning-drive, noon-hour and afternoon-drive news blocks) on December 5. This had resulted in the abrupt termination, on December 1, of most of the talk hosts (including Gene Burns, Gil Gross, John Rothmann, Ray Taliaferro, Len Tillem, and Dr. Bill Wattenburg). Ronn Owens's morning show, as well as weekend talk programming remained, although some of the weekend hosts (including Joanie Greggains, and Len Tillem) were also terminated on December 1, 2011. Bob Brinker's syndicated "Moneytalk" was moved to KSFO, a politically conservative talk radio sister station which arguably better reflects Brinker's conservative politico-economic views. KGO also dropped Leo Laporte's weekend syndicated tech talk program in the format change. Gil Gross, Len Tillem and Leo Laporte would all move to competitor KKSF.

The format change and termination of many popular talk show hosts sparked outrage among long-time listeners, many of whom called for sponsors to drop their advertising on the station. Ratings declined substantially following the change, with competitors KCBS and KQED-FM continuing to lead the market, and in December 2014, KGO reintroduced talk programming on weekdays. In December 2014, KGO added Chip Franklin to the noon to 3 pm lineup. In January 2015, KGO announced they had hired Chicago/San Antonio radio personality Kevin "DreX" Buchar, best known for his successful morning show on Chicago's WKSC-FM, which ran for more than a decade, from 7PM to 10PM. John Batchelor's syndicated show aired overnights, returning KGO to the same level of news programming as before 2011.

Both KGO and Dallas-based sister station KLIF shared similar visual "News/Information" identities after KLIF's parent Cumulus acquired Citadel until 2014, when talk programming was reintroduced.

On March 31, 2016, at Noon, KGO dropped its previous programming and began stunting with recordings of speeches from influential figures and people talking about San Francisco, as well as songs about the city, while promoting "The Next Generation of KGO" to launch on April 5 (though with a break during the weekend for paid programming). At least 20 people, including the entire news staff, as well as some staffers from sister station KFOG, were laid off with the change. Originally, long-time KGO host Ronn Owens announced that he would be moving to sister station KSFO in the afternoon slot beginning April 4. However, due to what was advertised as a 'listener reaction' against the move (in reality, Owens contested the move of his show off KGO as against the terms of his contract), Owens stayed with KGO. KGO kept its news/talk format, but relaunched it with a new live and local lineup, which included Owens and Armstrong & Getty in mornings; Armstrong & Getty, a regionally syndicated program based at KSTE in Sacramento, had previously aired in the Bay Area on KKSF. Owens left the station in 2018, and Armstrong & Getty moved to KSFO in 2020 to be replaced by Nikki Medoro, previously an afternoon news anchor.

2020s: end of news and talk; "The Spread"
On October 6, 2022, at approximately 10:16 a.m., KGO abruptly ended the news/talk format in the middle of midday host Mark Thompson's show; Thompson later said he had been informed just before going on-air that a format change would be implemented shortly, but was asked not to use the opportunity to say goodbye to listeners. Instead, mid-show, Thompson was signaled to give a final station identification; the station then began a stunt loop featuring songs and promotional announcements referring to betting, money, and winning. The promotions stated that a new format, billed as "the most unique radio station in the Bay Area", would launch on October 10, assuring listeners that they "can bet on it". On that day, KGO launched a sports talk format emphasizing sports betting, branded as "810 The Spread"; the new format has no local programming, and the station's schedule is primarily sourced from the BetQL and CBS Sports Radio networks, serving as a complement to sister sports stations KNBR-FM and KTCT.

Sports
KGO was the radio broadcast home for the San Francisco 49ers football team from 1987 to 2005. It has broadcast UC Berkeley Golden Bears Football games since 1974; since 2013, it also broadcast select California Golden Bears men's basketball games. The station began to air San Jose Earthquakes soccer games in 2023.

Annual Cure-a-Thon
Until the sudden format change in December 2011, KGO hosted an annual fundraiser called the KGO Cure-a-Thon to help raise money for The Leukemia & Lymphoma Society with all of the station's regular programming pre-empted for an entire day during the event. Listeners were encouraged to call in and donate money to help in the fight against these kinds of cancer. An auction was also held to help raise money. Notable items up for auction have included a trip with Gene Burns on a private jet to various destinations, such as Las Vegas and Italy, for a gourmet dinner. Cumulus Media has announced that it will not be continuing the KGO Cure-a-Thon charity event despite the fact it has raised millions of dollars for charity in the past.

Solar power
In March 2008, solar panels were installed at KGO's transmitter site in Fremont, California, to offset some of its power consumption during daytime hours. The effort is a testbed for Pacific Gas and Electric Company and is located near the Dumbarton Bridge. The solar system uses both CPV (SolFocus) and PV (Premier Power) arrays and provides about 17 Kilowatts, or 33% (one third), of the radio frequency (RF) power output from the 50KW transmitter (or about one-tenth of the total power consumption of their transmitter site over a 24-hour period). United States Speaker of the House Rep. Nancy Pelosi turned the system on during an on-air ceremony.

Former staff 

 James Abbe
 Robert J. Ackerly
 Ken Bastida
 Barbara Boxer
 Joy Browne
 Gene Burns
 Angie Coiro
 Peter B. Collins
 Brian Copeland 
 Russ Coughlan
 Christine Craft
 Les Crane
 Mark Curtis
 Jim Dunbar
 Jim Eason
 Dean Edell
 Art Finley
 Michael Finney
 Chip Franklin
 James Gabbert
 Duane Garrett
 Joanie Greggains
 Gil Gross
 Greg Jarrett
 Michael Krasny
 Leo Laporte 
 David Lazarus
 Dick Leonard
 J. P. McCarthy
 Larry Mendte
 Melanie Morgan
 Kevin Radich
 John Rothmann
 Michael Savage
 Lon Simmons
 Barbara Simpson
 Joe Starkey
 Monty Stickles
 Ray Taliaferro
 Mark Thompson
 Len Tillem
 Wayne Walker
 Bernie Ward
 Bill Wattenburg
 Jack Webb
 Jim Wieder 
 Dennis Willis
 Pete Wilson 
 Lloyd Lindsay Young

See also
 KGO-TV
 KKSF

References

External links
The Spread 810 AM official website

John Schneider's History of KGO Radio
A Technical Description of the KGO Facility in 1924
The Complete KGO Collection in The Bay Area Radio Museum

GO (AM)
Clear-channel radio stations
Cumulus Media radio stations
Radio stations established in 1924
1924 establishments in California
California Golden Bears men's basketball
Former General Electric subsidiaries
Former subsidiaries of The Walt Disney Company
Sports radio stations in the United States
CBS Sports Radio stations